was an engineer and statistician. From the 1950s onwards, Taguchi developed a methodology for applying statistics to improve the quality of manufactured goods. Taguchi methods have been controversial among some conventional Western statisticians, but others have accepted many of the concepts introduced by him as valid extensions to the body of knowledge.

Biography

Taguchi was born and raised in the textile town of Tokamachi, in Niigata prefecture. He initially studied textile engineering at Kiryu Technical College with the intention of entering the family kimono business. However, with the escalation of World War II in 1942, he was drafted into the Astronomical Department of the Navigation Institute of the Imperial Japanese Navy.

After the war, in 1948 he joined the Ministry of Public Health and Welfare, where he came under the influence of eminent statistician Matosaburo Masuyama, who kindled his interest in the design of experiments. He also worked at the Institute of Statistical Mathematics during this time, and supported experimental work on the production of penicillin at Morinaga Pharmaceuticals, a Morinaga Seika company.

In 1950, he joined the Electrical Communications Laboratory (ECL) of the Nippon Telegraph and Telephone Corporation just as statistical quality control was beginning to become popular in Japan, under the influence of W. Edwards Deming and the Union of Japanese Scientists and Engineers. ECL was engaged in a rivalry with Bell Labs to develop cross bar and telephone switching systems, and Taguchi spent his twelve years there in developing methods for enhancing quality and reliability. Even at this point, he was beginning to consult widely in Japanese industry, with Toyota being an early adopter of his ideas.

During the 1950s, he collaborated widely and in 1954-1955 was visiting professor at the Indian Statistical Institute, where he worked with C. R. Rao,  Ronald Fisher and Walter A. Shewhart. While working at the SQC Unit of ISI, he was introduced to the orthogonal arrays invented by C. R. Rao - a topic which was to be instrumental in enabling him to develop the foundation blocks of what is now known as Taguchi methods.

On completing his doctorate at Kyushu University in 1962, he left ECL, though he maintained a consulting relationship. In the same year he visited Princeton University under the sponsorship of John Tukey, who arranged a spell at Bell Labs, his old ECL rivals. In 1964 he became professor of engineering at Aoyama Gakuin University, Tokyo. In 1966 he began a collaboration with Yuin Wu, who later emigrated to the U.S. and, in 1980, invited Taguchi to lecture. During his visit there, Taguchi himself financed a return to Bell Labs, where his initial teaching had made little enduring impact. This second visit began a collaboration with Madhav Phadke and a growing enthusiasm for his methodology in Bell Labs and elsewhere, including Ford Motor Company, Boeing, Xerox and ITT.

Since 1982, Genichi Taguchi has been an advisor to the Japanese Standards Institute and executive director of the American Supplier Institute, an international consulting organisation.  His concepts pertaining to experimental design, the loss function, robust design, and the reduction of variation have influenced fields beyond product design and manufacturing, such as sales process engineering.

Contributions

Taguchi has made a very influential contribution to industrial statistics. Key elements of his quality philosophy include the following:
Taguchi loss function, used to measure financial loss to society resulting from poor quality;
The philosophy of off-line quality control, designing products and processes so that they are insensitive ("robust") to parameters outside the design engineer's control.
Innovations in the statistical design of experiments, notably the use of an outer array for factors that are uncontrollable in real life, but are systematically varied in the experiment.

Honours

1960 - Deming Prize for Individuals
1986 - Willard F. Rockwell Medal of the International Technology Institute
1989 - Indigo Ribbon from the Emperor of Japan
1990 - Honoured as a Quality Guru by the British Department of Trade and Industry
1995 - Honorary member of the Japanese Society of Quality Control
1996 - Honorary Fellow of the Institute of Directors (India)
1997 - Automotive Hall of Fame Inductee
1998 - Honorary member of the American Society for Quality
1998 - Honorary member of the American Society of Mechanical Engineers
1999 - Honorary president of the Robust Quality Engineering Society (Japan)

Book

References

External links
Photograph of Dr. Genichi Taguchi
ASQ Taguchi Biography
  

Academic staff of Aoyama Gakuin University
Japanese business theorists
Japanese industrial engineers
Quality
Quality experts
Japanese statisticians
1924 births
2012 deaths
Imperial Japanese Navy personnel of World War II